Silex is an unincorporated community in the southeast corner of Wayne Township, Owen County, in the U.S. state of Indiana. It lies on County Road 490 North (a.k.a. Lingle Road) just east of Indiana Highway 67, which is a community about ten miles northeast of the city of Spencer, the county seat.  Its elevation is 600 feet (183 m), and it is located at  (39.3606017 -86.6597248).

Geography
 This community lies on the west side of Indian Creek, which flows south into the White River.

School districts
 Spencer-Owen Community Schools, including a high school.

Political districts
 State House District 46
 State Senate District 37

References

External links
 Roadside Thoughts for Silex, Indiana

Unincorporated communities in Owen County, Indiana
Unincorporated communities in Indiana